The 1990 United States Senate election in Nebraska was held on November 5, 1990. Incumbent Democratic U.S. Senator J. James Exon won re-election to a third term. , this was the last time the Democrats won the Class 2 Senate seat in Nebraska.

Candidates

Democratic 
 J. James Exon, incumbent U.S. Senator

Republican 
 Hal Daub, U.S. Representative

Results

See also 
 1990 United States Senate elections

References 

Nebraska
1990
1990 Nebraska elections